Groningen Noord (abbreviation: Gnn) is a railway station located Groningen, Netherlands. The station was opened on 15 June 1884 and is located on the Groningen–Delfzijl railway. The train services are operated by Arriva.

Train service
The following services currently call at Groningen Noord:
2x per hour local service (stoptrein) Groningen - Eemshaven
2x per hour local service (stoptrein) Groningen - Delfzijl

References

External links
 
 Groningen Noord station, station information

Buildings and structures in Groningen (city)
Transport in Groningen (city)
Railway stations in Groningen (province)
Railway stations opened in 1884